Insperity, Inc., previously known as Administaff, Inc., is a professional employer organization headquartered in Kingwood, an area of Houston, Texas, USA. Insperity provides human resources and administrative services to small and medium-sized businesses. Since 2004, the company has been title sponsor of a professional golf tournament on the Champions Tour, previously known as the Administaff Small Business Classic. Paul J. Sarvadi, Chairman of the Board and Chief Executive Officer and co-founder of the Company and its subsidiaries, is a Class II director and has been a director since the Company's inception in 1986.

Insperity serves more than 100,000 businesses with more than 2 million employees. The company has more than 2,200 corporate employees in over 60 offices across the US.

Insperity is publicly traded on the New York Stock Exchange under the ticker symbol NSP. The company completed its initial public offering in January 1997.

References

External links

 

1997 initial public offerings
Companies based in Houston
Companies listed on the New York Stock Exchange
American companies established in 1986